Strand Theatre or Strand Theater may refer to:

Australia 
 Strand Theatre, Toowoomba, Queensland, Australia

England 
 Royal Strand Theatre, London, demolished 1905
 Strand Theatre, London, called the Novello Theatre since 2005

United States

 Strand Theatre, former movie house in Ocean Beach, San Diego, California, built in 1925
 Strand Theatre (San Francisco), reopening in 2015 now owned by American Conservatory Theater, originally opened in 1917 and shuttered in 2003, in San Francisco, California
 Strand Theatre (Jennings, Louisiana), listed on the National Register of Historic Places in Jefferson Davis Parish, Louisiana
 Strand Theatre (Shreveport, Louisiana), listed on the National Register of Historic Places in Caddo Parish, Louisiana
 Strand Theatre (Rockland, Maine), listed on the National Register of Historic Places in Knox County, Maine
 Strand Theatre, Brockton, Massachusetts, site of a fire that killed 13 firefighters in 1941
 Strand Theatre (Boston), a restored vaudeville house located in Uphams Corner in Boston, Massachusetts
 Strand Theater (Lexington, Mississippi), a Mississippi Landmark
 Strand Theater (Louisville, Mississippi), a Mississippi Landmark
 Strand Theater (Manchester, New Hampshire), theater portion destroyed by fire in 1985
 Strand Theatre (Lakewood, New Jersey), listed on the National Register of Historic Places in Ocean County, New Jersey
 Strand Theatre (Brooklyn), a former vaudeville house now home to BRIC Arts and UrbanGlass
 Strand Theatre (Ithaca, New York), listed on the National Register of Historic Places in Tompkins County, New York
 Strand Theatre (Manhattan), demolished Broadway movie theatre opened in 1914
 Strand Theater (Plattsburgh, New York), listed on the National Register of Historic Places in Clinton County, New York
 Strand Theater (Syracuse, New York), theatre in Syracuse, New York from 1915 to 1958
 Strand Theatre (Grafton, North Dakota), listed on the National Register of Historic Places in Walsh County, North Dakota
 Strand Theatre (Delaware, Ohio), movie theatre opened in 1916
 Strand Theater (Zelienople, Pennsylvania), a community theatre
 Strand Theater (Washington, D.C.), listed on the National Register of Historic Places in Washington, D.C.
 Strand Theatre (Moundsville, West Virginia), home of the Wheeling Jamboree radio program
 Strand Theater (Allentown, Pennsylvania), a former cinema in Allentown, Pennsylvania
 Strand Theatre (Marietta, Georgia), a performing arts and film center in Marietta, Georgia, United States of America